Denver Lindley (1904-1982) was an American translator noted for his translations of works by Thomas Mann, Hermann Hesse, Ernst Schnabel, André Maurois, and others. Lindley studied at Princeton University and joined Collier's magazine as an editor in 1927.

Works Translated 
 "The History of Jesus Christ" Author, R. L. (Raymond Leopold) Bruckberger, The Viking Press, 1965.

References 

 Denver Lindley, Editor, Dies; Translator of Mann, Maurois, NYT, February 15, 1982.

1904 births
1982 deaths
German–English translators
20th-century American translators